Phostria mungalis is a moth in the family Crambidae. It was described by Plötz in 1880. It is found in Cameroon.

References

Phostria
Moths described in 1880
Moths of Africa